Strawberry anemone may refer to several taxa of sea anemones:

 Actinia fragacea, a species found in the north-eastern Atlantic Ocean and the Mediterranean
 Corynactis, a genus 
 Corynactis annulata, a species found in the southern Atlantic Ocean
 Corynactis californica, a species found on the Pacific coast of North America